The E. S. Greening House was a historic house at 707 East Division Street in Hope, Arkansas.  It was a two-story wood-frame structure built in 1903, with a projecting bay rising a full two stories and a shed-roof porch wrapping around two sides of the house.  The house was notable primarily for its high quality and elaborate interior woodwork, even though its exterior was not a particularly elaborate version of Queen Anne styling.

The house was listed on the National Register of Historic Places in 1987.  As of 2014, it has apparently been demolished, and is (according to the Arkansas Preservation Office) in the process of being delisted from the National Register.

See also
National Register of Historic Places listings in Hempstead County, Arkansas

References

Houses on the National Register of Historic Places in Arkansas
Queen Anne architecture in Arkansas
Houses completed in 1903
Houses in Hempstead County, Arkansas
National Register of Historic Places in Hempstead County, Arkansas